Rock the World is the third studio album by Canadian heavy metal band Kick Axe. The album was released at the end of 1986 in the format of vinyl and cassette album on Epic Records, distributed through CBS in the band's native Canada.

In 1987, the Roadrunner Records released it on vinyl in the Netherlands and the smaller label Mercenary Records released it on vinyl, cassette and compact disc in the USA later the same year. That CD was a much sought-after collectible, going for as much as over $150 on eBay.

In 2005, the band remastered and reissued the album on CD (albeit with different cover artwork), on their own label. Included is a bonus track "Piece of the Rock", a leftover from the Vices recording session in early 1984.

In 2016, a UK label Rock Candy remastered and reissued the album on CD in a 'De Luxe' version comprising a comprehensive booklet, loaded with vintage photos and a very detailed band history by Malcolm Dome.

Recorded and mixed at the Inside Trak Studios, Vancouver, British Columbia, Canada and produced at the Emil's Studio, Surrey, British Columbia, Canada by Kick Axe's guitarist Larry Gillstrom on a very limited budget. Similarly as on the Welcome to the Club album, Rock the World includes one covered track, "The Chain", originally from the Fleetwood Mac. The album combines the rawness of the debut with the commercial touch of their follow up, but this album is going harder and never captures as easily as its predecessors. It is considered to be the weakest of the band's 1980's era albums.

This album has never made it into the Billboard 200 album chart.

Track listing 
"Rock the World" (G.Criston/B.Gillstrom/L.Gillstrom/V.Langen) – 4:06
"The Chain" (L.Buckingham/M.Fleetwood/Ch.McVie/J.McVie/S.Nicks) – 4:33
"Red Line" (G.Criston/B.Gillstrom/L.Gillstrom/V.Langen) – 3:04
"Devachan" (G.Criston/B.Gillstrom/L.Gillstrom/V.Langen) – 5:08
"Warrior" (G.Criston/B.Gillstrom/L.Gillstrom/V.Langen) – 4:44
"We Still Remember" (G.Criston/B.Gillstrom/L.Gillstrom/V.Langen) – 5:46
"The Great Escape" (G.Criston/B.Gillstrom/L.Gillstrom/V.Langen) – 3:14
"Medusa" (G.Criston/B.Gillstrom/L.Gillstrom/V.Langen) – 4:26
"The Dark Crusade" (G.Criston/B.Gillstrom/L.Gillstrom/V.Langen) – 4:42
"Magic Man" (G.Criston/B.Gillstrom/L.Gillstrom/V.Langen) – 5:25

Personnel 
George Criston – lead vocals
Larry Gillstrom – lead and rhythm guitars, backing vocals, keyboards
Victor Langen – bass, backing vocals, keyboards
Brian Gillstrom – drums, backing vocals

Production 
Larry Gillstrom – producer
Dave Slagter - recording & mixing engineer
Gary Tole, Lisa Barton - engineering assistants
Sandy Flett - cover art
Mystique Studios - sleeve design

References

External links 
 
Official Fan website

1986 albums
Kick Axe albums